Dermatobranchus semistriatus is a species of sea slug, a nudibranch, a marine gastropod mollusc in the family Arminidae.

Distribution
This species occurs in the Indo-Pacific region.

References

 Gosliner T.M. & Fahey S.J. (2011) Previously undocumented diversity and abundance of cryptic species: a phylogenetic analysis of Indo-Pacific Arminidae Rafinesque, 1814 (Mollusca: Nudibranchia) with descriptions of 20 new species of Dermatobranchus. Zoological Journal of the Linnean Society 161: 245–356.
page(s): 249

Arminidae
Gastropods described in 1949